The Billboard Dance Club Songs chart ranks the most-played songs being played in dance clubs throughout the United States. Under the title Hot Dance Club Play in 2008, the first number-one song of the year was Dave Gahan's "Kingdom", and it ranked at number 10 on the 2008 Dance Club Play year-end chart. Artists to achieve one number one song on the chart throughout the course of 2008 were Celine Dion with "Taking Chances" which ranked at number 30 on the 2008 year-end list, Mary J. Blige with "Just Fine" which ranked at number 45 on the 2008 year-end list, Mariah Carey with "Touch My Body" which ranked at number 40 on the 2008 year-end list, and Rihanna with "Disturbia". Bob Sinclar and Steve Edwards topped the chart with "Together", which claimed the number one position on the 2008 year-end chart as the most performed song in dance clubs.

Multiple artists achieved two number-one dance singles throughout the course of 2008. Kimberley Locke topped the chart with "Band of Gold" and "Fall". The former ranked at number 11 on the 2008 year-end chart, while the latter ranked at number 39. Britney Spears achieved two number ones on the chart with "Piece of Me" and "Break the Ice". "Piece of Me" ranked at number 37 on the 2008 year-end chart, while "Break the Ice" ranked at number 42. Madonna and Donna Summer both topped the chart with two songs, and were the only artists in 2008 to have one song each peak at number one for two consecutive weeks. Madonna claimed the number one position twice with the songs "4 Minutes", featuring Justin Timberlake, which spent two consecutive weeks atop the chart, and with "Give It 2 Me". Summer's "Stamp Your Feet" also topped the chart for two consecutive weeks, and with "I'm a Fire".  Other artists earning two number ones during 2008 are Yoko Ono, Cyndi Lauper, Erin Hamilton, Moby, and Solange. Natasha Bedingfield earned the most number-ones during 2008, with three: "Love like This", "Pocketful of Sunshine" and "Angel".

These are the Billboard Hot Dance Club Play and Singles Sales number-one hits of 2008.

See also
List of number-one dance airplay hits of 2008 (U.S.)
2008 in music
List of number-one dance hits (United States)
List of artists who reached number one on the U.S. Dance chart

References

2008
United States Dance Singles
2008 in American music